Tavrichanka is a rural locality (a selo) and the administrative center of Kysylsky Selsoviet, Alsheyevsky District, Bashkortostan, Russia. The population was 635 as of 2010. There are 6 streets.

Geography 
Tavrichanka is located 48 km southeast of Rayevsky (the district's administrative centre) by road. Sulpan is the nearest rural locality.

References 

Rural localities in Alsheyevsky District